Penzberger Urmel is a Bavarian literary prize.

Winners
2005 Kurt Bracharz: Wie der Maulwurf beinahe in der Lotterie gewann
2007 Dagmar Geisler : Wanda und die Mädchenhasserbande
2009 Brian Selznick : Die Entdeckung des Hugo Cabret (The Invention of Hugo Cabret)
2011 Anke Dörrzapf (author) and Claudia Lieb (illustrator): Die wunderbaren Reisen des Marco Polo
2013 Hanna Schott (author) und Gerda Raidt (illustrator): Fritzi war dabei – Eine Wendegeschichte
2015 Paul Biegel (author) und Linde Faas (illustrator): Die Prinzessin mit den roten Haaren
2017 Kai Pannen (author and illustrator): Du spinnst wohl. Eine außergewöhnliche Adventsgeschichte in 24 Kapiteln
2019 Antonia Michaelis (author) und Claudia Carls (illustrator): Das Blaubeerhaus

Literary awards of Bavaria